Tell AJam (also Romanized as Tell AJam; also known as Tell-e ‘Olyā and Tell-e Bālā) is a village in Shurab Rural District, Veysian District, Dowreh County, Lorestan Province, Iran. At the 2006 census, its population was 95, in 23 families.

References 

Towns and villages in Dowreh County